The 1980–81 Wyoming Cowboys basketball team represented the University of Wyoming as a member of the Western Athletic Conference during the 1980–81 NCAA Division I men's basketball season. The Cowboys, led by second-year head coach Jim Brandenburg, played their home games at War Memorial Fieldhouse in Laramie, Wyoming.

Roster

Schedule and results

|-
!colspan=9 style=| Regular Season

|-
!colspan=9 style=| NCAA tournament

Rankings

References

Wyoming Cowboys basketball seasons
Wyoming
Wyoming
1980 in sports in Wyoming
1981 in sports in Wyoming